Bani Basu (born 11 March 1939 ) is a prolific Bengali Indian author, essayist, critic, poet, translator and professor.

Life 
She received her formal education from the well-known Lady Brabourne College, Scottish Church College and at the University of Calcutta where she received M.A. in English.

Career 
Basu began her career as a novelist with the publication of Janmabhoomi Mātribhoomi. A prolific writer, she started her professional career as an author from 1980, first in “Anandamala”, a juvenile magazine, then in “Desh” and other periodicals of the time. 

She is known as a novelist, short story writer, essayist, and writings for children and teenagers. Some of her fictions have been made into films & TV Serials. The broad range of her fiction deals with gender, history, mythology, society, psychology, adolescence, music, sexual orientation, the supernatural, and more. Her major works include Swet Pātharer Thālā (A Plate of White Marble), Ekushe Pā (Turning Twenty One), Maitreya Jātak (published as The Birth of the Maitreya by Stree), Gāndharvi, Pancham Purush (The Fifth Generation) and Ashtam Garbha (The Eighth Pregnancy). She also writes poetry, and translates extensively into Bengali.

She was awarded the Tarashankar Award for Antarghāt (Treason), and the Ananda Purashkar for Maitreya Jātak. She is also the recipient of the Sushila Devi Birla Award and the Sahitya Setu Puraskar. In 2010 she was awarded Sahitya Academy for her contributions to Bengali literature.

Bibliography 
 Swet Pātharer Thālā (1990)
 Gāndharbi (1993)
 Mohanā (1993)
 Ekushe Pā (1994)
 Maitreya Jātak (1999)
 Upanyās Panchak (1999)
 Ashtam Garbha (2000)
 Antarghāt 
 Pancham Purush 
 Khanamihirer Dhipi (2009)
Kharap Chele
Meyeli Addar Halchal

Film and Television serial based on her Books

 Swet Patherer Thala (Film)
 Gandharvi (Film and TV Serial)
 Swet Patherer Thala (TV Serial)
 Ekushe Pa (TV Serial)
 Nandita (Tele Fim)
 Mrs Gupta Ra (Tele Film)
 Jakhan Chand (Tele Film)
 Bhab Murti (Tele Film)
 Balleygunge Court (Tele Film)
 Shakhambherir Dwip (TV Serial)
 Amrita (TV Serial)

Awards 

 Tara Sankar Award (1991)
 Sahitya Setu Chandra (1995)
 Siromoni Award (1997)
 Ananda Award (1997)
 Bankim Award (1998)
 Mahadevi Birla Award (1998)
 Katha Award (2003)
 Pratima Mitra Smiti Award (2007)
 Kabi Kritibas Sahitya Award (2008)
 Bhuban Mohini Dasi Swarna Padak, Calcutta University (2008)
 Sachindra Nath Sahitya Award 
 Sahitya Akademi Award (2010)

References

External links

Meenakshi Mukherjee's essay on Bani Basu's novels

20th-century Bengalis
21st-century Bengalis
Bengali writers
1939 births
Living people
Lady Brabourne College alumni
Scottish Church College alumni
University of Calcutta alumni
Academic staff of the University of Calcutta
Indian women novelists
Indian women essayists
Recipients of the Ananda Purashkar
Recipients of the Sahitya Akademi Award in Bengali
Writers of historical romances
Women romantic fiction writers
Indian historical novelists
20th-century Indian novelists
20th-century Indian women writers
Women historical novelists
Writers from Kolkata
Women writers from West Bengal
Novelists from West Bengal